The 1924 South American Championships in Athletics  were held in Buenos Aires, Argentina between 17 and 22 April.

Medal summary

Men's events

Medal table

References
 Men Results – GBR Athletics
 Women Results – GBR Athletics

S
South American Championships in Athletics
South
 Sports competitions in Buenos Aires
1924 in South American sport
Athletics